Saint-Mars-de-Coutais is a commune in the Loire-Atlantique department in western France.

Transport

Gare de Port-Saint-Père-Saint-Mars is served by train services between Pornic, Saint-Gilles-Croix-de-Vie and Nantes.

See also
Communes of the Loire-Atlantique department

References

Saintmarsdecoutais